Live in Manchester is a live album/home video by English recording artist Lisa Stansfield, released on 28 August 2015.

Background and content 
After a long absence from the music industry, Stansfield returned in 2014 with her studio album Seven, followed by a sold-out European Seven Tour. Recorded in Stansfield's hometown Manchester at Bridgewater Hall on 7 September 2014 during the tour, Live in Manchester presents Stansfield performing her greatest hits like "All Around the World" and tracks from her latest album Seven. Filmed by Tim Sidwell and mastered at Abbey Road Studios, Live in Manchester was released on 2CD, DVD and Blu-ray on 28 August 2015 on earMUSIC. The bonus material is an over 25 minutes long interview with Stansfield in which she talks about Seven.

Track listing

Charts

References 

2015 live albums
2015 video albums
Live video albums
Lisa Stansfield albums